Hart County is a county located in the northeastern part of the U.S. state of Georgia. As of the 2020 census, the population was 25,828. The county seat is Hartwell.

Hart County was created December 7, 1853 and named for Nancy Hart. Of Georgia's 159 counties, Hart County is the only one named after a woman. Lake Hartwell is also named for her.

Letters to Miss Celie in the movie The Color Purple (film) by Steven Spielberg, based on the novel The Color Purple by Alice Walker, are addressed to "Hartwell County, Georgia" suggesting that the movie is set either in Hartwell or Hart County.

Geography
The county is located in the Piedmont region of the state.

Most of the southern three-quarters of Hart County is located in the Upper Savannah River sub-basin of the larger Savannah River basin, with the exception of two slivers of the county, south of Royston and west of Bowersville, which are located in the Broad River sub-basin of the Savannah River basin.  The northern quarter of the county is located in the Tugaloo River sub-basin of the same Savannah River basin.

Major highways

  Interstate 85
  U.S. Route 29
  State Route 8
  State Route 17
  State Route 51
  State Route 59
  State Route 77
  State Route 77 Connector
  State Route 77 Spur
  State Route 172
  State Route 180
  State Route 281
  State Route 403 (unsigned designation for I-85)

Adjacent counties
 Oconee County, South Carolina (north)
 Anderson County, South Carolina (northeast)
 Elbert County (south)
 Madison County (southwest)
 Franklin County (west)

Demographics

2000 census
As of the census of 2000, there were 22,997 people, 9,106 households, and 6,610 families living in the county.  The population density was 99 people per square mile (38/km2).  There were 11,111 housing units at an average density of 48 per square mile (18/km2).  The racial makeup of the county was 79.09% White, 19.36% Black or African American, 0.15% Native American, 0.53% Asian, 0.24% from other races, and 0.63% from two or more races.  0.85% of the population were Hispanic or Latino of any race.

There were 9,106 households, out of which 29.00% had children under the age of 18 living with them, 56.80% were married couples living together, 12.00% had a female householder with no husband present, and 27.40% were non-families. 24.40% of all households were made up of individuals, and 10.60% had someone living alone who was 65 years of age or older.  The average household size was 2.47 and the average family size was 2.92.

In the county, the population was spread out, with 23.50% under the age of 18, 7.70% from 18 to 24, 27.30% from 25 to 44, 25.00% from 45 to 64, and 16.50% who were 65 years of age or older.  The median age was 39 years. For every 100 females there were 97.00 males.  For every 100 females age 18 and over, there were 92.70 males.

The median income for a household in the county was $32,833, and the median income for a family was $39,600. Males had a median income of $30,652 versus $21,233 for females. The per capita income for the county was $16,714.  About 12.20% of families and 14.80% of the population were below the poverty line, including 19.10% of those under age 18 and 16.50% of those age 65 or over.

2010 census
As of the 2010 United States Census, there were 25,213 people, 10,121 households, and 6,998 families living in the county. The racial makeup of the county was 77.4% white, 18.7% black or African American, 0.9% Asian, 0.1% American Indian, 1.7% from other races, and 1.3% from two or more races. Those of Hispanic or Latino origin made up 3.1% of the population. In terms of ancestry, 13.6% were American, 8.4% were English, 7.4% were Irish, and 6.6% were German.

Of the 10,121 households, 30.7% had children under the age of 18 living with them, 51.1% were married couples living together, 13.6% had a female householder with no husband present, 30.9% were non-families, and 27.4% of all households were made up of individuals. The average household size was 2.43 and the average family size was 2.94. The median age was 42.6 years.

The median income for a household in the county was $36,109 and the median income for a family was $44,451. Males had a median income of $35,172 versus $26,836 for females. The per capita income for the county was $19,124. About 17.4% of families and 22.4% of the population were below the poverty line, including 30.4% of those under age 18 and 13.4% of those age 65 or over.

2020 census

As of the 2020 United States Census, there were 25,828 people, 9,853 households, and 6,743 families residing in the county.

Attractions 
 Lake Hartwell, a man-made lake covering 56,000 acres built for flood control and recreation
 The Scarecrow festival occurs in Hartwell every year during the month of October. This is when the downtown gets "invaded" by scarecrows, which are handmade scarecrows placed in front of local shops and businesses.
 Cateechee is one of the state's finest golf courses. It has 380 acres of land and 18 holes.
 The Hartwell Dam is the county's largest generator of electricity, supplying power to more than 10 states. It can be seen at the Georgia and South Carolina border or U.S. Route 29. Usually power is generated daily and a long fog horn is heard all around the dam before they start generating.

Communities

City
 Hartwell

Town
 Bowersville

Census-designated places
 Eagle Grove
 Reed Creek

Other unincorporated communities
 Air Line

Politics

See also

 National Register of Historic Places listings in Hart County, Georgia
List of counties in Georgia

References

External links
 Hart County historical marker
 Parkertown 1832 historical marker

 
Georgia (U.S. state) counties
1853 establishments in Georgia (U.S. state)
Northeast Georgia
Counties of Appalachia
Populated places established in 1853